Jefre José Vargas Belisario (born 12 January 1995) is a Venezuelan professional footballer who plays as a right back for Metropolitanos.

Honours
 Copa Venezuela: 2013

References

External links
 
 

Living people
1995 births
Association football defenders
Venezuelan footballers
Venezuela international footballers
Caracas FC players
F.C. Arouca players
Asociación Civil Deportivo Lara players
Primeira Liga players
Venezuelan Primera División players
Venezuelan expatriate footballers
Venezuelan expatriate sportspeople in Portugal
Expatriate footballers in Portugal